Varmahlíð is a small village in Skagafjörður, northern Iceland.

Around 140 people live on the eastern slope of the hill for which the town is named (varmur=warm, hlíð=slope).

Varmahlíð is on the ring road Route 1, at the junction of Route 75 leading to Sauðárkrókur, about 24 km to the north. Varmahlíð is in the middle of a flourishing agricultural area, where the Icelandic horse has been treasured for centuries. One of the main industries is horse-rearing. The area has an abundance of geothermal hot water. Hence Varmahlíð has a number of greenhouses with tropical and sub-tropical fruits and vegetables.

Varmahlíð stands high on the western side of a valley, at the crossroads at the foot of Vatnsskarð pass. Near Varmahlíð stands the turf roofed church at Víðimýri, built in 1834, which has a magnificent altarpiece dating from 1727. The monument to Icelandic poet Stephan Stephansson is located at Vatnsskarð pass.

Miðgarður, a concert hall, can be found at Varmahlíð. One of Iceland's most famous men's choirs, Karlakórinn Heimir, is based there.

Sport 
Smári Varmahlíð

References 

Populated places in Northwestern Region (Iceland)